Layton Morgan (born March 6, 1942) is an American politician who served in the Wyoming House of Representatives from the 12th district from 1999 to 2007.

References

1942 births
Living people
Democratic Party members of the Wyoming House of Representatives